Rhoshii Wells (December 30, 1976 – August 11, 2008) was an American boxer, who won the bronze medal in the Middleweight Division at the 1996 Summer Olympics. He was born in Austin, Texas.

Amateur career
Olympic Results
 Defeated Kourosh Molaei (Iran) 24-7
 Defeated Ricardo Rodríguez (Brazil) 16-2
 Defeated Dilshod Yarbekov (Uzbekistan) 8-8, judges cards
 Lost to Ariel Hernández (Cuba) 8-17

Pro career
Nicknamed "The Great One", Wells began his professional career in 1997, and got off to a 17-0-2 start in the Light Middleweight division, setting up a shot at WBA Light Middleweight Title holder Alejandro Garcia in 2003.  He was ahead on the scorecards before Garcia stopped him in the 11th round.  In 2005, Wells got shot at a rematch with Garcia and lost via TKO in the 9th.

He attempted a comeback on the 3rd season of the boxing reality TV series, The Contender on ESPN, but was eliminated before the competition began.

Death
Rhoshii Wells was shot and killed in Las Vegas, Nevada on August 11, 2008. Police arrested 26-year-old Roger Randolph, who claimed that he shot Wells in self-defense after Wells punched him and robbed him of $100. The District Attorney stated that they would seek the death penalty against Randolph.

In May 2012, Randolph was sentenced to 20 years to life for murder with a deadly weapon, plus one to 12 years for discharging weapon where a person might be endangered.

References

External links
 

1976 births
2008 deaths
2008 murders in the United States
Boxers at the 1996 Summer Olympics
Olympic bronze medalists for the United States in boxing
Sportspeople from Austin, Texas
Deaths by firearm in Nevada
People murdered in Nevada
Boxers from Texas
American male boxers
Medalists at the 1996 Summer Olympics
Middleweight boxers
African-American boxers
20th-century African-American sportspeople
21st-century African-American sportspeople